Johnny Ray Turner is an American politician. He is a former Democratic member of the Kentucky Senate, representing the 29th District from 2001 to 2021. He served as Minority Caucus Chair from 2003 to 2014.

In April 2007, Turner was sentenced to three months' home detention and one year of probation for "non-willful" vote buying.

References

External links
Kentucky Legislature - Senator Johnny Ray Turner official government site
Project Vote Smart - Senator Johnny Ray Turner (KY) profile
Follow the Money - Johnny Ray Turner
2008 2006 2004 2000 campaign contributions
KentuckyVotes.org - Sen. Johnny Ray Turner  bills introduced and voting record

Kentucky state senators
1949 births
Living people
Political corruption
21st-century American politicians